Kashasha is a village on the western coast of Lake Victoria in the Muleba District of the Kagera Region, Tanzania, near the border of Uganda. The village is known for having been the locus of the Tanganyika laughter epidemic of 1962.

In 2016 the Tanzania National Bureau of Statistics report there were 12,508 people in the ward, from 11,021 in 2012.

Villages 
The ward has 14 villages.

 Rubya
 Kashenshero
 Kitarabwa
 Omukitenge
 Kifo
 Kiiga
 Buhanama
 Bukijungu
 Nyaruhanga
 Bukambiro
 Nyakashunshu
 Rwabona
 Kigabiro
 Kanyambogo

References

Populated places in Kagera Region